Donovans was a village located west of St. John's, Newfoundland and Labrador, eastern Canada. It had a population of 325 by 1956. It has been absorbed by the Town of Paradise where population density is 3,338 per square mile.

See also
 List of communities in Newfoundland and Labrador

References

Populated places in Newfoundland and Labrador